Holy Trinity Church, Gidleigh dates from the  late 15th-century, and is a Grade I listed parish church in the Church of England Diocese of Exeter in Gidleigh, Devon.

History

The church has Saxon, or possibly Norman, origins, but was completely rebuilt at the end of the 15th century. It comprises a nave continuous with the chancel which is covered with a waggon shaped roof of Devon oak. The side aisle on the south side is separated from the nave by a three-bay arcade, supported by granite columns.  The tower at the west end contains the ring of bells, which are rung from the floor of the church.

The rood screen dates from the 15th century and was decorated in 1853 when the images of saints were added along the lower panels.

The font is 15th century but had a wooden cover made in 1843 by Charles Finch, the parish clerk. In 1853, John Aggett carved the granite pulpit and lectern. He also carved the reredos in 1868 which was originally installed in Chagford church.

In 1863 the rector, Arthur Whipham, submitted a petition for divorce from his wife on the grounds of her alleged adultery with Philip Rowe, a farmer's son from Berrydown farm, Gidleigh. They were caught in bed together at the rectory by P.C. James Bird of the Devon constabulary.

Organ
The pipe organ sits at the back of the south aisle. It was built by Murdoch, Murdoch and Company of London and comprises 5 stops, A specification of the organ can be found in the National Pipe Organ Register.

Bells
The tower contains a peal of 5 bells with the three oldest dating from around 1450.

Rectory
The Old Rectory was built between 1896 and 1897 and occupied by the rectors of Gidleigh until the end of the 20th century. The first occupant was Reverend Burnett who moved in during 1897. It is now in private hands.

Rectors

References

Gidleigh
Gidleigh